Scott Township is one of the sixteen townships of Brown County, Ohio, United States. The 2010 census found 1,294 people in the township.

Geography
Located in the center of the county, it borders the following townships:
Pike Township - north
Washington Township - northeast
Franklin Township - southeast
Pleasant Township - south
Clark Township - west

No municipalities are located in Scott Township.

Name and history
Scott Township was established in 1828.

Statewide, other Scott Townships are located in Adams, Marion, and Sandusky counties.

Government
The township is governed by a three-member board of trustees, who are elected in November of odd-numbered years to a four-year term beginning on the following January 1. Two are elected in the year after the presidential election and one is elected in the year before it. There is also an elected township fiscal officer, who serves a four-year term beginning on April 1 of the year after the election, which is held in November of the year before the presidential election. Vacancies in the fiscal officership or on the board of trustees are filled by the remaining trustees.

References

External links
County website

Townships in Brown County, Ohio
Townships in Ohio
1828 establishments in Ohio
Populated places established in 1828